MgM - MineClearance NGO Stiftung Menschen gegen Minen e.V. ("People Against Landmines") is a humanitarian landmine clearance organization headquartered in Germany.  It was founded on January 16, 1996, and is a registered charity under German law.

MgM provides de-mining services to areas that have recently emerged from warfare.  Their efforts are focused in Africa, particularly in the countries of Angola, Mozambique, and Namibia.  MgM employs a broad range of mine-removal technologies, including a fleet of specialized vehicles.  The organization has also contributed to research and development in the de-mining arena.  Prominent among their innovations is the "Rotar" armored de-mining vehicle, which is in use today around the world. Their "Voodoo" road clearance system for secondary roads is often called a class of its own.  They combine armoured graders with explosives sniffer dogs. Until mid 2007 MgM officially cleared some 3,000 km of road into formerly not accessible areas.

External links 
 MgM Website

Mine warfare and mine clearance organizations
Organizations established in 1996